Casey Stengel took over as manager for the 1934 Brooklyn Dodgers, but the team still finished in 6th place.

Offseason 
 December 1933: Art Herring was purchased by the Dodgers from the Detroit Tigers.
 December 1933: Joe Shaute was purchased from the Dodgers by the Cincinnati Reds.

Regular season

Season standings

Record vs. opponents

Notable transactions 
 April 13, 1934: Marty McManus was purchased from the Dodgers by the Boston Braves.
 June 29, 1934: Watty Clark was purchased by the Dodgers from the New York Giants.
 September 1934: Johnny Vander Meer was purchased from the Dodgers by the Boston Braves.

Roster

Player stats

Batting

Starters by position 
Note: Pos = Position; G = Games played; AB = At bats; H = Hits; Avg. = Batting average; HR = Home runs; RBI = Runs batted in

Other batters 
Note: G = Games played; AB = At bats; H = Hits; Avg. = Batting average; HR = Home runs; RBI = Runs batted in

Pitching

Starting pitchers 
Note: G = Games pitched; IP = Innings pitched; W = Wins; L = Losses; ERA = Earned run average; SO = Strikeouts

Other pitchers 
Note: G = Games pitched; IP = Innings pitched; W = Wins; L = Losses; ERA = Earned run average; SO = Strikeouts

Relief pitchers 
Note: G = Games pitched; W = Wins; L = Losses; SV = Saves; ERA = Earned run average; SO = Strikeouts

Awards and honors 
1934 Major League Baseball All-Star Game
Al López reserve
Van Mungo reserve

Farm system

Notes

References 
Baseball-Reference season page
Baseball Almanac season page

External links 
1934 Brooklyn Dodgers uniform
Brooklyn Dodgers reference site
Acme Dodgers page 
Retrosheet

Los Angeles Dodgers seasons
Brooklyn Dodgers
Brooklyn
1930s in Brooklyn
Flatbush, Brooklyn